The Edison and Swan Electric Light Company Limited was a manufacturer of incandescent lamp bulbs and other electrical goods. It was formed in 1883 with the name Edison & Swan United Electric Light Company with the merger of the Swan United Electric Company and the Edison Electric Light Company.

Thomas Edison established the Edison Electric Light Company in 1878.  Joseph Swan established the Swan United Electric Light Company in 1881. Swan sued Edison in the UK, claiming patent infringement; this was upheld by the British courts. In 1882, Edison sued Swan, claiming infringement of his 1879 U.S. patent; however, the Edison Company believed their case would be jeopardized if Swan could demonstrate prior research and publication. Subsequently, in order to avoid uncertain and expensive litigation, the two companies negotiated a merger. The glass bulbs sold in Britain were of Swan's design, while the filaments were of Edison's. From 1887 or earlier Sir Ambrose Fleming was an adviser to the company, and conducted research at Ponders End.

The company had offices at 155 Charing Cross Road, London, and factories in Brimsdown, Ponders End and Sunderland. In 1928, the company was acquired by Associated Electrical Industries. In 1956, a new cathode ray tube plant was opened in Sunderland. The company was renamed Siemens Ediswan following the takeover of Siemens Brothers by AEI in 1957. In 1964, AEI merged its lamp and radio valve manufacturing interests with those of Thorn Electrical Industries to form British Lighting Industries Ltd.

Ediswan Valves
Edison Swan (or later Siemens Edison Swan) produced a wide range of vacuum tubes and cathode ray tubes under the names "Ediswan" or "Mazda" and the 1964 Mazda Valve Data Book claimed: "Professor Sir. Ambrose Fleming... was Technical Consultant to the Edison Swan Company at the time.  It was this close co-operation between University and Factory which resulted in the first radio valve in the world."
Ediswan still survives as a manufacturer of valves (located in Bromsgrove England).

See also
 La Compagnie des Lampes (1921), EdiSwans French counterpart, which also made light bulbs and electronic tubes under the Mazda brand

References

Further reading
 Bowers, Brian. "The Rise of the Electricity Supply Industry." History Today (March 1972), Vol. 22 Issue 3, pp 176-183 online
 Bowers, Brian. "Edison and Early Electrical Engineering in Britain." History of Technology Volume 13 (2016): 168+
 David, Paul A., and Julie Ann Bunn. "The economics of gateway technologies and network evolution: Lessons from electricity supply history." Information economics and policy 3.2 (1988): 165-202.
 Hughes, Thomas Parke. "British Electrical Industry Lag: 1882-1888" Technology and Culture 3#1 (1962), pp. 27-44 online

External links
 http://www.gracesguide.co.uk/Edison_Swan_Electric_Co
 http://www.vintage-technology.info/pages/ephemera/vemazda.htm

Electrical engineering companies of the United Kingdom
Lighting brands
Vacuum tubes
General Electric Company
Associated Electrical Industries
Manufacturing companies established in 1883